The Vulnerability Assessment Laboratory (VAL) was a research institution under the U.S. Army Materiel Command (AMC) that specialized in missile electronic warfare, vulnerability, and surveillance. It was responsible for assessing the vulnerability of Army weapons and electronic communication systems to hostile electronic warfare and coordinating missile electronic countermeasure efforts for the U.S. Army. VAL was one of the seven Army laboratories that merged to form the U.S. Army Research Laboratory (ARL) in 1992.

History 
The Vulnerability Assessment Laboratory stemmed from a long generation of Army research and development laboratories that have undergone extensive organizational restructuring and multiple name changes. Its roots trace back to the Signal Corps Laboratories, which directed research into electronics, radar, and communication systems at Fort Monmouth, New Jersey.

In 1946, the Signal Corps Engineering Laboratories sent a small team of researchers to White Sands Missile Range to perform firing tests on the captured German V-2 rockets. On January 1, 1949, the Signal Corps Engineering Laboratories Field Station No. 1 was established at Fort Bliss, Texas to conduct research in radar tracking and communication systems to provide support for the early missile programs at White Sands Missile Range. In 1952, Field Station No. 1 was reorganized to form the White Sands Signal Corps Agency, which sought to improve munition performance by conducting high altitude and upper atmosphere research. In the first ten months of 1958, the Agency provided communication-electronics support for the firing of more than 2,000 missiles. The White Sands Signal Corps Agency also developed the Voice Operated Device for Automatic Transmission (VODAT), a device that made it possible for two-way radiotelephone conversations to occur on a single frequency.

By 1959, the White Sands Signal Corps Agency had doubled in size and scope of operations and was redesignated as the U.S. Army Signal Missile Support Agency (SMSA). SMSA was responsible for providing communication-electronic, meteorologic, and other support for the Army's missile and space program as well as conducting research and development in meteorology, electronic warfare, and missile vulnerability. It was involved in the installation of the vast communication network at White Sands Missile Range and developed the Sonic Observation of Trajectory and Impact of Missiles (SOTIM) System, which provided acoustic information on missiles upon re-entry and impact. These stations were installed at 16 different points at WSMR and were also equipped to measure wind speed, temperature, and humidity. SMSA also built meteorological rockets that could carry a 70-pound instrument package as high as 600,000 feet in order to obtain upper atmospheric data.

Due to a major Army restructuring effort, SMSA became a part of the Electronics Research and Development Activity under the U.S. Army Electronics Command (ECOM) in 1962. In June 1965, the Army Electronics Laboratories, which supervised the prior Signal Corps research within the U.S. Army Electronics Command, was discontinued. As a result, the Army Electronics Laboratories and its components, including the Electronics Research and Development Activity, were broken up and reshuffled into six separate Army laboratories: the Electronic Components Laboratory (later the Electronics Technology and Devices Laboratory), the Communications/ADP Laboratory, the Atmospheric Sciences Laboratory, the Electronic Warfare Laboratory, the Avionics Laboratory, and the Combat Surveillance and Target Acquisition Laboratory.

Within the newly organized Electronic Warfare Laboratory (EWL), the Missile Electronic Warfare Division represented the origin of the Vulnerability Assessment Laboratory. The division's name was changed again to the Missile Electronic Warfare Technical Area (MEWTA) before it became the Office of Missile Electronic Warfare (OMEW) in the early 1970s. OMEW was responsible for conducting research on missile electronic warfare and ascertain missile system vulnerabilities while developing appropriate electronic counter-countermeasures at White Sands Missile Range. In 1985, the Office of Missile Electronic Warfare was renamed the Vulnerability Assessment Laboratory. The headquarters for VAL were located at White Sands Missile Range, New Mexico, but major elements of the laboratory were also stationed at Fort Monmouth, New Jersey, and Kirtland Air Force Base, New Mexico. By 1988, the Vulnerability Assessment Laboratory consisted of more than 250 personnel, 60 military and 196 civilian.

In 1992, the Vulnerability Assessment Laboratory was among the seven Army laboratories that was consolidated to form the U.S. Army Research Laboratory following the Base Realignment and Closure (BRAC) in 1988. Under the Army Research Laboratory, the Vulnerability Assessment Laboratory transitioned into the Survivability/Lethality Analysis Directorate.

Research 
The Vulnerability Assessment Laboratory, much like its predecessors, was primarily responsible for conducting vulnerability and susceptibility assessments of all U.S. Army weapons, communications, and electromagnetic systems to protect against electronic warfare threats. At the time, the consolidation of all vulnerability assessment functions into a single element made the U.S. Army unique in this regard compared to the U.S. Navy and the U.S. Air Force. In addition, VAL coordinated research on electronic counter-countermeasures and performed electronic warfare vulnerability assessments on foreign missile systems.

The Vulnerability Assessment Laboratory was made up of five divisions designed to cover each of its mission areas: Air Defense, Communications-Electronics, Close Combat and Fire Support, Foreign Missiles, and Technology and Advanced Concepts. Common electronic warfare threats that were taken into consideration by VAL included jamming, radar-reflecting chaff that hid the targets, and decoy flares. In general, electronic countermeasure assessments consisted of engineering evaluations, laboratory investigations, computer simulations, and field experiments. VAL also maintained an extensive inventory of technologies that simulated electronic countermeasure environments and developed “hardening” techniques in response to these threats.

Projects 
The Vulnerability Assessment Laboratory was involved in the development of several technologies, including steerable null antenna processor (SNAP) systems used against enemy jammer threats and various high-power microwaves. In 1985, VAL conducted a major field experiment testing the feasibility of the Stinger-RMP missile system, which significantly influenced its production.

VAL has also participated in the improvement of the following technologies and systems:

 Stinger Post (FIM-92B): A passive surface-to-air missile that utilized an IR/UV seeker to resist enemy countermeasures.
 MIM-104 Patriot: A surface-to-air missile system that uses an AN/MPQ-53 or AN/MPQ-65 radar set to function as an anti-ballistic missile system.
 Pershing II: A two-stage ballistic missile that had served as one of the U.S. Army's primary nuclear-capable theater-level weapons.
 MIM-23 Hawk: A surface-to-air missile that used a semi-active radar homing guidance system designed to attack aircraft flying at low to medium altitudes.
 BGM-71 TOW: Short for “Tube-launched, Optically tracked, Wire-guided”; an anti-tank missile with a semi-automatic guidance system.
 Single-channel ground-air radio system (SINCGARS): A combat-net radio (CNR) used by U.S. and allied military forces for voice and data communications.
 Night Chaparral: A variant of the MIM-72 Chaparral, a surface-to-air missile system that used Forward Looking InfraRed (FLIR) technology for enhanced night performance.

See also 

 Electronics Technology and Devices Laboratory
 Atmospheric Sciences Laboratory
 Signal Corps Laboratories
 White Sands Missile Range

References 

Military technology
Research installations of the United States Army
White Sands Missile Range
Military installations in New Mexico